The 1957 Lamar Tech Cardinals football team was an American football team that represented Lamar State College of Technology—now known Lamar University–as a member of the Lone Star Conference (LSC) during the 1957 NCAA College Division football season. Led by fifth-year head coach James B. Higgins, the Cardinals compiled an overall record of 8–0–2 with a mark of 5–0–2 in conference play, winning the LSC title.

Schedule

References

Lamar Tech
Lamar Cardinals football seasons
Lone Star Conference football champion seasons
College football undefeated seasons
Lamar Tech Cardinals football